Bryce Allan (1 March 1859 – 22 August 1922) was a Scotland international rugby union player.

Rugby Union career

Amateur career

He played for Glasgow Academicals.

Provincial career

He played for Glasgow District in their inter-city match against Edinburgh District on 4 December 1880.

He played for West of Scotland District in their match against East of Scotland District on 5 February 1881.

International career

He was capped for Scotland just the once, in 1881, against Ireland.

Business career

He became a merchant and shipowner, along with his brothers Henry Allan and Richard Gilkinson Allan. They ran the Clyde firm, the Allan Line Steamship Company; founded by their grandfather Alexander Allan.

In 1905, he took a lease of the North Bute shootings.

The value of Allan's estate when he died was £224,358 pounds, 3 shillings and 10 pence.

Family

He was born to James Allan (1808-1880) and Eleanor Blair Gilkinson (1822-1868), one of 8 children. He married Anne Smiley Clark in 1886. They had 2 children; Annie Clark (Nita) Allan and James Bryce Allan.

References

1859 births
1922 deaths
Scottish rugby union players
Scotland international rugby union players
Rugby union players from Glasgow
Glasgow Academicals rugby union players
West of Scotland District (rugby union) players
Glasgow District (rugby union) players
Rugby union forwards